

A list of films produced in Belgium ordered by year of release. For an alphabetical list of Belgian films see :Category:Belgian films

Pre 1960
 List of Belgian films before 1960

1960s
 List of Belgian films of the 1960s

1970s
 List of Belgian films of the 1970s

1980s
 List of Belgian films of the 1980s

1990s
 List of Belgian films of the 1990s

2000s
 List of Belgian films of the 2000s

2010s
 List of Belgian films of the 2010s

See also
List of years in Belgium
List of years in Belgian television

External links
 Belgian film at the Internet Movie Database